Ganna is both an Italian surname, a feminine Ukrainian given name (equivalent of Hanna) and a Maltese name (Ġanna-pronounced Gannah in english). Notable people with the name include:

Surname
Filippo Ganna (born 1996), Italian cyclist
Luigi Ganna (1883–1957), Italian cyclist
Marco Ganna (born 1961), Italian sprint canoeist and father of Filippo

Given name
Ganna Burmystrova (born 1977), Ukrainian team handball player
Ganna Gryniva (born 1989), Ukrainian jazz singer
Ganna Ielisavetska, Ukrainian Paralympic swimmer
Ganna Khlistunova (born 1988), Ukrainian swimmer
Ganna Pushkova-Areshka (born 1978), Belarusian sprint canoeist
Ganna Rizatdinova (born 1993), Ukrainian rhythmic gymnast
Ganna Siukalo (born 1976), Ukrainian team handball player
Ganna Smirnova, Ukrainian dancer
Hanna Solovey (born 1992), Ukrainian cyclist
Ganna Sorokina (born 1976), Ukrainian diver
Ganna Walska (1887–1984), Polish opera singer

Italian-language surnames
Ukrainian feminine given names